The Monument Rock Wilderness Area is a wilderness area within the Malheur and Wallowa–Whitman national forests in the Blue Mountains of eastern Oregon. It was designated by the United States Congress in 1984 and comprises .

Topography
The area includes the headwaters of the Little Malheur and the upper drainages of the South Fork of the Burnt River.

Vegetation

Ponderosa pine, Douglas fir, white fir, lodgepole pine, and quaking aspen cover the moderate slopes of the wilderness, while subalpine fir grow in the higher elevations.  Large, grassy meadows also appear throughout the area.

Wildlife
Black bears, deer, elk, and badgers are common in the Monument Rock Wilderness.  Seventy species of birds live in the area, including hawks, grouse, and the American dipper.  The wilderness is also home to the more elusive wolverine.

See also
 List of Oregon Wildernesses
 List of U.S. Wilderness Areas
 Wilderness Act

References

External links

Photo gallery of the wilderness from the Forest Service

Wilderness areas of Oregon
Protected areas of Baker County, Oregon
Protected areas of Grant County, Oregon
Malheur National Forest
Wallowa–Whitman National Forest
1984 establishments in Oregon
Protected areas established in 1984